The World We Left Behind is the seventh and final studio album by American psychedelic black metal band Nachtmystium, released in August 2014.

Track list

Charts

References

2014 albums
Nachtmystium albums
Century Media Records albums